José Ramón Argote Vega (born 17 October 1980 in Maracaibo, Zulia) is a Venezuelan football referee. He works as a vet and became FIFA ref in 2008, and is a CONMEBOL category 3 referee.

References

1980 births
Living people
Sportspeople from Maracaibo
Venezuelan football referees
Copa América referees
21st-century Venezuelan people